Magnus Finne Wørts (born 8 February 1999) is a retired Danish football midfielder. Wørts announced his retirement in July 2022 at the age of 23, as he wanted to pursue a civilian career.

References

1999 births
Living people
Danish men's footballers
Association football midfielders
FC Nordsjælland players
HB Køge players
Mjällby AIF players
Danish 1st Division players
Allsvenskan players
Danish expatriate men's footballers
Expatriate footballers in Sweden
Danish expatriate sportspeople in Sweden